is a Japanese surname. Notable people with the surname include:

, a Japanese samurai and martial artist
Nobuyuki Sakakibara, a Japanese businessman and mixed martial arts promoter
Seito Sakakibara, alias of the perpetrator of the Kobe child murders
Yui Sakakibara, a Japanese voice actress
Yoshiko Sakakibara (born 1956), a Japanese voice actress
Ikue Sakakibara (born 1959), a Japanese singer
, a Japanese daimyō
Saya Sakakibara (born 1999), a Japanese Australian cyclist

Fictional characters
Shiho Sakakibara, a Japanese manga/anime character in Oh My Goddess!
Kōichi Sakakibara, a Japanese manga/anime character in Another

See also
Sakakibara clan, a samurai family in Edo-period Japan
Sakakibara-Onsenguchi Station

Japanese-language surnames